Melo is a nickname. Notable people with the name include:

Melo Anthony or Carmelo Anthony (born 1984), American basketball player 
Melo Trimble (born 1995), American basketball player 
Han "Melo" Su-nam (Born 1998), Japanese/American E-sports player
Melo Ball or LaMelo Ball (born 2001), American basketball player

References

Lists of people by nickname